The Biya (Biy) is a river in the Altai Republic and Altai Krai in Russia. At its confluence with the Katun, downstream of the city Biysk, the Ob is formed. The Biya is 301 km long; the area of its drainage basin is 37,000 km2. It flows out of the Lake Teletskoye. The river freezes up in mid-November to early December (some parts of the river freeze over on a year-to-year basis). It breaks up in early or mid-April. The Biya is navigable on its entire length.

References

Rivers of Altai Krai
Rivers of the Altai Republic